Joaquín Valle Montero (born 15 May 1954) is a Spanish weightlifter. He competed at the 1984 Summer Olympics and the 1988 Summer Olympics.

Notes

References

External links
 
 
 
 

1954 births
Living people
Spanish male weightlifters
Olympic weightlifters of Spain
Weightlifters at the 1984 Summer Olympics
Weightlifters at the 1988 Summer Olympics
Sportspeople from Málaga
20th-century Spanish people
21st-century Spanish people